Teng Pei-Yin (born January 9, 1943) is a retired Taiwanese Ambassador.
From 1972 till 1973 he was Junior Clerk at the Ministry of Foreign Affairs (Taiwan) in Taipei.
From 1973 till 1990 he was Secretary and Director of the Office of the Ministry of Foreign Affairs (Taiwan) in Hong Kong.
From 1991 till 1992 he was Deputy Director of the Bureau of Consular Affairs in the Ministry of Foreign Affairs (Taiwan).
From 1995 to 1998 he was head of the Taipei Economic and Cultural Representative Office in New Delhi.
From  to  he was ambassador in Honiara.
Starting in 1999 he was concurrently accredited in Nauru and Tuvalu.

References

1943 births
Living people
Ambassadors of the Republic of China to the Solomon Islands
Ambassadors of the Republic of China to Nauru
Ambassadors of the Republic of China to Tuvalu